Tessa Clare Wallace (born 9 September 1993) represented Australia at the 2010 Commonwealth Games in Delhi, India, her debut into major international meets.  Wallace's only Commonwealth Games race, the 200-metre breaststroke, was held on Wednesday 6 October.  After a solid heat she qualified 6th for the final, where she came second to ex-world record-holder and fellow Australian, Leisel Jones.  Not far behind Tessa, Sarah Katsoulis finished 3rd, completing an Australia sweep of gold, silver and bronze medals.

On 20 March 2012, Wallace qualified for her first Olympic Games.  At the 2012 Summer Olympics in London, she advanced to the semifinals of the women's 200-metre breaststroke, and finished with the 15th-best time overall.

References

External links
 
 
 
 
 
 

1993 births
Living people
Australian female breaststroke swimmers
Swimmers at the 2010 Commonwealth Games
Commonwealth Games silver medallists for Australia
Olympic swimmers of Australia
Swimmers at the 2012 Summer Olympics
Swimmers at the 2014 Commonwealth Games
Commonwealth Games medallists in swimming
21st-century Australian women
Medallists at the 2010 Commonwealth Games